The 2009 Samarkand Challenger was a professional tennis tournament played on outdoor red clay courts. It was part of the 2009 ATP Challenger Tour. It took place in Samarkand, Uzbekistan between 10 and 16 August 2009.

Singles entrants

Seeds

 Rankings are as of August 3, 2009.

Other entrants
The following players received wildcards into the singles main draw:
  Jakhongir Jalalov*  Farrukh Dustov
  Vaja Uzakov
  Sergey Shipilov

The following players received entry from the qualifying draw:
  Kaden Hensel
  Jun Woong-sun
  Mikhail Ledovskikh
  Patrick Taubert

Champions

Singles

 Dustin Brown def.  Jonathan Dasnières de Veigy, 7–6(3), 6–3

Doubles

 Kaden Hensel /  Adam Hubble def.  Valery Rudnev /  Ivan Sergeyev, 7–5, 7–5

References
Official website
ITF search 

Samarkand Challenger
Samarkand Challenger
2009 in Uzbekistani sport
August 2009 sports events in Asia